Orthogonis stygia is a species of robber flies (insects in the family Asilidae).

References

Laphriinae
Articles created by Qbugbot
Insects described in 1931